Washington's 6th congressional district encompasses the Olympic Peninsula, the Kitsap Peninsula, and most of the city of Tacoma. Its counties include the entirety of Clallam, Kitsap, Mason, Jefferson, and Grays Harbor counties, and part of Pierce County. The 6th district has been represented in the U.S. House of Representatives by Derek Kilmer, a Democrat from Gig Harbor, since January 2013. He succeeded 36-year incumbent and fellow Democrat Norm Dicks, at the time the dean of the Washington delegation.

Established after the 1930 U.S. Census, the 6th district is a working class district, with many of its jobs provided by tourism and a declining timber industry on the Pacific and Juan de Fuca coasts, and by the Puget Sound Naval Shipyard in Bremerton.

Presidentially, the 6th leans Democratic. It was one of only two districts retained by the Democrats in the Republican realignment election of 1994.

Recent election results from presidential races

List of members representing the district

Recent election results

2012

2014

2016

2018

2020

2022

See also
United States House of Representatives elections in Washington, 2008
United States House of Representatives elections in Washington, 2010
United States House of Representatives elections in Washington, 2012

References

 Congressional Biographical Directory of the United States 1774–present

External links
Washington State Redistricting Commission
Find your new congressional district: a searchable map, Seattle Times, January 13, 2012

06